Laura Dean (born Laura Francine Deutscher; May 27, 1963) is an American film, television and voice actress who is known for the roles of Sophie, Rachel's coworker at Bloomingdale's, in the 3rd and 4th seasons of Friends, of the character Tamara in Princess Gwenevere and the Jewel Riders, and on Christmas in Cartoontown. Since she was 10 years old, she also played the New York City Opera for five years in La bohème, Die tote Stadt and Mefistofele. She is best known as the character "Lisa" the ballet dancer who gets kicked out of the dance department in the film Fame. She also appeared in the Broadway musical version of Doonesbury and as the mother of the title character in The Who's Tommy.

References

External links 
 

1963 births
Living people
Actresses from New York City
American film actresses
American television actresses
American voice actresses
20th-century American actresses
21st-century American actresses